The Vannellidae are a family of Amoebozoa, which are found in soil, fresh- and salt water. The most common genus is Vannella.

Description
Vannellidae tend to be flattened and fan-shaped during motion, although some are long and narrow, and have a prominent clear margin at the anterior. In most amoebae, the endoplasm glides forward through the center of the cell, but vannellids undergo a sort of rolling motion with the outer membrane sliding around like a tank tread. These amoebae are usually 10-40 μm in size, but some are smaller or larger.

Vannellidae are surrounded by an outer covering called the glycocalyx, which is generally 10-20 nm across, though the thickness varies among species. In some species, a layer of hair-like filaments called glycostyles protrudes from the glycocalyx.

Taxonomy
Molecular phylogenies include them in the class Flabellinia as a sister group to the others, which have subpseudopodia.

References

Amoebozoa families
Discosea